Chiuta District is a district of Tete Province in western Mozambique. The principal town is 
Manje. The district is located in the center of the province, and borders with Chifunde District in the north, Macanga District in the northeast, Tsangano District in the east, Moatize District in the southeast, Changara District in the south, Cahora-Bassa District in the southwest, and with Marávia District in the west. It has a population of 74,534 as of 2007.

Geography
The Zambezi makes the southwestern border of the district. Other major rivers in the district are the Revúboé River, the Chiritse River, the Luye River, the Phonfi River, and the Mavudzi River.

The climate of the district is tropical humid, with the average annual rainfall being .

Demographics
As of 2005, 50% of the population of the district was younger than 15 years. 15% of the population spoke Portuguese. The most common mothertongue among the population was Cinyungwe. 84% were analphabetic, mostly women.

Administrative divisions
The district is divided into two postos, Kazula (four localities) and Manje (four localities).

Economy
Less than 1% of the households in the district have access to electricity.

Agriculture
In the district, there are 14,000 farms which have on average  of land. The main agricultural products are corn, cassava, cowpea, peanut, sugar cane, and sweet potato.

Transportation

References

Districts in Tete Province